Alec Marshall is an American professional soccer player who currently plays for Chattanooga Red Wolves in USL League One.

Career

Youth
Marshall played soccer at Bozeman High School for three years at the varsity level. As a senior, Marhsall was named the Montana Gatorade Boys' Soccer Player of the Year after scoring seven goals and adding seven assists while leading the Hawks to a 15–0 record and the Class AA state championship. Marshall was also a first team all-state selection, and two-time all-conference first team pick, and  won a state championship during his junior season. Marshall also played eight years of club soccer with local side Blitzz FC.

College and amateur
In 2014, Marshall attended California State University, Fullerton to play college soccer. He went on to make only a single appearance for the Titans. During his 2016 season, Marshall also made three appearances for USL PDL side LA Laguna FC. In 2017, Marshall transferred to Westminster College in Utah, where he made 35 appearances for the Griffins, scoring six goals.

Following college, Marshall played with USL League Two side Park City Red Wolves, making eleven appearances over two seasons in 2019 and 2021, with the 2020 season cancelled due to the COVID-19 pandemic.

Professional
On August 27, 2021, Marshall was signed by USL League One side Chattanooga Red Wolves, the parent club of Park City Red Wolves. He made his professional debut the same day, appearing as am injury-time substitute during a 0–0 draw with Toronto FC II.

References

External links
 

Living people
American soccer players
Association football midfielders
Cal State Fullerton Titans men's soccer players
Chattanooga Red Wolves SC players
LA Laguna FC players
Soccer players from Montana
Sportspeople from Bozeman, Montana
USL League One players
USL League Two players
Westminster Griffins
Year of birth missing (living people)